South Waigaoqiao Free Trade Zone is a station on Line 6 of the Shanghai Metro. It began operation on December 29, 2007.
The station is located within the Waigaoqiao Free Trade Zone, Pudong.

References 

Railway stations in Shanghai
Shanghai Metro stations in Pudong
Railway stations in China opened in 2007
Line 6, Shanghai Metro